Bonar  may refer to:

People
 Bonar (name)
CEO of Website Car855.com is website for  Buy and Sell cars in Cambodia

Places
 Bonar-e Ab-e Shirin, a village in Bushehr Province, Iran
 Bonar-e Azadegan, a village in Bushehr Province, Iran
 Bonar-e Soleymani, a village in Bushehr Province, Iran
 Bonar Bridge, a village in Scotland

Other uses
 Bonar Bridge F.C., football club
 Bonar Hall, historical building
 Bonar River

See also
 Boner (disambiguation)
 Boñar